The 2010 South American Rugby Championship was the 32nd edition of the two tiered competition of the leading national Rugby Union teams in South America.

In the first phase ("Copa Atilio Rienzi") four teams play to qualify to the final pool, with Argentina (holder) admitted directly. The first two were qualified, keeping the results of their matches, also for second round. Uruguay won the pool and Chile was the runner-up.

Phase 1

Standings
{| class="wikitable"
|-
!width=165|Team
!width=40|Played
!width=40|Won
!width=40|Drawn
!width=40|Lost
!width=40|For
!width=40|Against
!width=40|Difference
!width=40|BP
!width=40|Pts
|- bgcolor=#ccffcc align=center
|align=left| 
|3||3||0||0||109||43||+66||0||9
|- align=center
|align=left| 
|3||2||0||1||92||50||+42||0||6
|- align=center
|align=left| 
|3||1||0||2||41||75||−34||0||3
|- align=center
|align=left| 
|3||0||0||3||38||112||−74||0||0
|}

Matches

Phase 2
{| class="wikitable"
|-
!width=165|Team
!width=40|Played
!width=40|Won
!width=40|Drawn
!width=40|Lost
!width=40|For
!width=40|Against
!width=40|Difference
!width=40|BP
!width=40|Pts
|- bgcolor=#ccffcc align=center
|align=left| 
|2||2||0||0||86||9||+77||0||6
|- align=center
|align=left| 
|2||1||0||1||36||57||−21||0||4
|- align=center
|align=left| 
|2||0||0||2||28||84||−56||0||2
|}
Argentina won the competition.

Results

Related Pages
2010 South American Rugby Championship "B"

External links

 IRB – South American Championship 2010

References

2010
2010 rugby union tournaments for national teams
A
2010 in Argentine rugby union
rugby union
rugby union
rugby union
rugby union
South American Rugby Championship "A"
International rugby union competitions hosted by Chile